Sarah York (born 1978) is an American woman who, at age 10, became the pen pal of Manuel Noriega, the then-de facto ruler of Panama. York began correspondence with Noriega after her father suggested on a whim that she should write to him because she liked the general's hat. This correspondence developed to the point where Noriega invited her family to visit him in Panama. Her family agreed to the visit, seeing it as a once-in-a-lifetime opportunity.

Overview
York (then 10 years old) and her mother toured Panama from October 5 through October 11, 1988, and they were escorted by a military guard on a tour of the country. She was interviewed constantly during her visit, becoming the main item on the Panamanian news, and the mayor of Panama City awarded her an honorary key to the city. 

Upon her return to her home in Negaunee, Michigan, she was praised at first, particularly by her school and community, but soon the story was covered in the national media, where she was derided and ridiculed for befriending an enemy of the United States. Nevertheless, York would visit Panama and Noriega again the following year in October 1989 – just two months before the United States invasion of Panama. Unlike the previous trip, her second visit was planned as a family vacation and was not at the invitation of Noriega. Accompanied by her father, York visited the country October 8 through October 17, meeting Noriega while there. Her parents were criticized for allowing her to visit Panama, and for encouraging her friendship with Noriega, then a highly controversial figure. After her second trip, an editorial in the local newspaper, The Mining Journal, criticized their return trip in the wake of the coup, in contrast to the previous reception a year earlier.

She has since lived on a self-sufficient farm in remote rural Wisconsin, and was interviewed by the radio show This American Life in 2003. Her story was used as the basis for a song, "Pineapple Girl" by the indie rock group, Mister Heavenly, on their 2011 album, Out of Love.

See also
Samantha Smith
Dear Dictator

References

Further reading

Living people
People from Negaunee, Michigan
History of Panama
Interlochen Center for the Arts alumni
1978 births